Raidió Rí-Rá ("Radio Fun"), founded in 2008, is an Irish language chart music radio station broadcasting on DAB in County Waterford and Dublin, on the Internet, and, for approximately one month a year, on FM radio. The station has offices on Harcourt Street in Dublin.

History
Raidió Rí-Rá was created to mark Seachtain na Gaeilge in March 2008 under the working title of Raidió X. Following a competition, its name was changed to Raidió Rí-Rá. The station was created as part of a collaboration between Digital Audition Productions and Conradh na Gaeilge to create an Irish language chart music radio station for young people. It broadcasts 24 hours a day with music and the latest pop news in Irish.

During March each year, Raidió Rí-Rá broadcasts on FM in Dublin, Cork, Galway and, prior to 2011, Limerick, to mark Seachtain na Gaeilge.

As of 2014, the station was broadcasting on DAB digital radio in Dublin and Waterford. During March 2011, it also broadcast on DAB as part of the South-East DAB Trial. It also launched a smartphone app.

The station proposed to obtain sufficient funding and a full national license on FM radio from the Broadcasting Authority of Ireland. In the interim, the station proposed to be available on Saorview, Ireland's Digital terrestrial television service.

See also
List of Irish-language media
List of Celtic-language media
Radio in Ireland

References

External links
 

Irish-language radio stations
2008 establishments in Ireland
Radio stations in Ireland
Radio stations established in 2008